The Asylum Light is located just north of Oshkosh, Wisconsin, in Winnebago County, Wisconsin. The lighthouse is located on a small island just a few feet away from the mainland in Asylum Bay on Lake Winnebago, Wisconsin. This lighthouse marks the separation between North and South Asylum Bays.

History

In 1871, construction began on the Northern Asylum for the Insane which was later called the Winnebago Mental Health Institute. The former name stuck though hence the name of the point, and bay. The lighthouse wasn't built until 1937 as the result of a "Works Progress Administration project". The Department of Transportation soon rejected the lighthouse as a navigational light causing it never to be lit.

The lighthouse received $4,000 in structural repairs which were carried out in 2007. In the mid 1990s a bridge was rebuilt to the island which allowed access to the Island that the lighthouse is on. Since that time though it has deteriorated rendering the structure unsafe for crossing.

Notes

Further reading

 Havighurst, Walter (1943) The Long Ships Passing: The Story of the Great Lakes, Macmillan Publishers.
 Oleszewski, Wes, Great Lakes Lighthouses, American and Canadian: A Comprehensive Directory/Guide to Great Lakes Lighthouses, (Gwinn, Michigan: Avery Color Studios, Inc., 1998) .
 
 Wright, Larry and Wright, Patricia, Great Lakes Lighthouses Encyclopedia Hardback (Erin: Boston Mills Press, 2006) .

External links

Buildings and structures in Oshkosh, Wisconsin
Lighthouses in Winnebago County, Wisconsin